Édison Andres Preciado Bravo (born April 18, 1986) is an Ecuadorian footballer currently playing for Liga de Cuenca (Liga Deportiva de Cuenca).

Club career
Preciado started his professional career at Audaz Octubrino but was soon sold to Deportivo Cuenca. He played 3 seasons with Cuenca and was soon noted for his goal scoring ability. However, his real success was shown in the 2009 season. After Cuenca qualified for the Copa Libertadores 2009, Preciado scored the only goal in a 1-0 home win against Boca Juniors. He signed for Ecuadorian giants El Nacional on January 6, 2009

After two years in Mexican club Atletico San Luis, Preciado left the club in the summer 2015, as the parties couldn't agree on a contract extension. In July 2015, he returned to his former club El Nacional. In January 2016, Preciado moved to Delfín SC.

In January 2017, Preciado returned to Deportivo Cuenca where he played the next three years. In March 2020, he joined Gualaceo SC. In November 2020, Preciado joined Orense.

In the summer 2021, Preciado joined Aviced FC.

References

1986 births
Living people
People from El Oro Province
Association football forwards
Ecuadorian footballers
Ecuadorian expatriate footballers
Ecuadorian Serie A players
C.D. Cuenca footballers
C.D. Técnico Universitario footballers
C.D. El Nacional footballers
Atlético San Luis footballers
Delfín S.C. footballers
Orense S.C. players
Ecuadorian expatriate sportspeople in Mexico
Expatriate footballers in Mexico